The Asessippi Ski Area is the largest ski resort in Manitoba. The resort is built into the side of the Shell River Valley, and is close to Asessippi Provincial Park. The ski area also offers dog sled rides.

The ski area was founded in 1998. The ski area remained open during the COVID-19 pandemic, except for two weeks when an employee tested positive.

References